Don Budge and Gene Mako successfully defended their title, defeating Henner Henkel and Georg von Metaxa in the final, 6–4, 3–6, 6–3, 8–6 to win the gentlemen's doubles tennis title at the 1938 Wimbledon Championship.

Seeds

  Don Budge /  Gene Mako (champions)
  Ladislav Hecht /  Roderich Menzel (third round)
  Dragutin Mitić /  Franjo Punčec (second round)
  Henner Henkel /  Georg von Metaxa (final)

Draw

Finals

Top half

Section 1

Section 2

Bottom half

Section 3

Section 4

References

External links

Men's Doubles
Wimbledon Championship by year – Men's doubles